Pinole, also called pinol or pinolillo, is roasted ground maize, which is then mixed with a combination of cocoa, agave, cinnamon, chia seeds, vanilla, or other spices. The resulting powder is then used as a nutrient-dense ingredient to make different foods, such as cereals, baked goods, tortillas, and beverages.  The name comes from the Nahuatl word pinolli, meaning cornmeal.  Today, pinole is generally made by hand using wood-burning adobe ovens and a stone and pestle, and is still consumed in certain, often rural, parts of Latin America. Pinole is considered the national beverage of Nicaragua and Honduras.

Nutrient content 

Depending on the type of pinole and the quality of its ingredients, pinole can be high in key vitamins and nutrients, including protein, amino acids, fiber, and antioxidants.  Due to the large amount of fiber and the slow digestion of the maize, pinole also has a very high satiety effect, leaving those who consume it feeling full for a longer period of time.  For many indigenous peoples of Mexico and Central America, it is relied upon as a key source of nutrition and sustenance.

Use by Tarahumara people  
Along with chia, pinole is a staple food of the Tarahumara Indians, a reclusive indigenous people living in the Copper Canyon of Mexico who call themselves Rarámuri, meaning "footrunners". Noted for physical stamina and their ability to run extraordinarily long distances wearing only huarache sandals with soles made of recycled tire treads and their traditional garb of a white cotton loincloth with a woven belt., the Rarámuri consume bajíachi (corn beer) and pinole before races.

Other folklore 
The recorded history of Pinole, California dates back to the early 1700s when a Spanish commandant, Don Pedro Fages, led an exploration through the Contra Costa shoreline of California. With a small band of soldiers and an Indian guide, Don Pedro Fages left Monterey and traveled northward until he reached the area known today as Pinole.  According to legend, the soldiers ran out of provisions on their march and found a village of Indians who gave them food. This food consisted of a form of meal, made from acorns, seeds, and wild grain, which they called “pinole” (derived from the Aztec word “pinolli” meaning ground and toasted grain or seeds.)  Thus, the soldiers named their camp “El Pinole,” and Pinole received its name.

In parts of central Mexico, groups of rowdy youths traditionally went from house to house during Carnival to demand pinole, which they were served without water (and frequently mixed with chili pepper to make it even more difficult to swallow). This custom may have given rise to the popular saying, El que tiene más saliva, traga más pinole ("Whoever has the most saliva, swallows the most pinole"; in other words, whoever has the most skill for a particular job will accomplish the most).

Commercial products 
Authentic pinole can occasionally be found in rural markets throughout Mexico and Central America.  It is generally made by hand and sold as a powder in burlap pouches.  A sugar-heavy, mass-market version can also sometimes be found in Latin American supermarkets under brands such as Don Julio.

Purely Pinole based in Los Angeles, California and owned by Native State Foods sells pinole to the American market throughout major retailers across the country and uses an exclusive nutrient dense heritage variety of purple corn.

Mazeria, a Texas-based company, has also begun selling a traditional recipe pinole.

Pinole Blue, a startup out of Wichita, Kansas, also sells heirloom, non-GMO blue corn pinole mixes and variations (such as Pumpkin Spice flavor) in 300+ physical stores, local Whole Foods locations, and direct to consumer through their website. Founded by Eddie Sandoval and team, the company became popular on TikTok due to their inspiring story, transparency, and connecting directly with their customers.

See also

 Gofio
 List of porridges
 Hominy
 Kinako

References

Further reading
Francisco J. Santamaría, Diccionario de mejicanismos, Mexico City: Editorial Porrúa, 1959, 1978.

External links
 Pinole: The Ultimate Bugout Food
 pinole.weebly.com

Flour
Maize dishes
Mexican cuisine
Native American cuisine
Porridges
Ancient dishes